The Monterey Peninsula Classic was a golf tournament on the Nationwide Tour from 2000 to 2003. It was played in Seaside, California at the Bayonet and Black Horse courses, formerly part of Fort Ord.

The purse each year was $450,000, with $81,000 going to the winner.

Winners

External links
Bayonet and Black Horse official site

Former Korn Ferry Tour events
Golf in California
Sports in Monterey County, California
Recurring sporting events established in 2000
Recurring events disestablished in 2003